Alfond Arena is a multi-purpose arena in Orono, Maine, United States. The arena opened in 1977. It is home to the University of Maine Black Bears ice hockey teams.  It is recognizable for its distinctive hyperbolic paraboloid architecture. The multi-angular roof design can also be found at Pavilion at Villanova University, the Brown University Smith Swim Center and the Flynn Recreation Complex at Boston College.  It is named for Harold Alfond, a longtime Maine booster, whose name also adorns Alfond Stadium, the school's main outdoor stadium.

It was expanded in 1992 from its original capacity of 3,800  in order to accommodate more spectators and bring the basketball team back from its temporary home at the Bangor Auditorium.  More skyboxes have been added since then, so the arena's capacity has been reduced. As of the 2022-2023 season, the capacity was 5,125 for hockey.  The arena includes the Bear Necessities Fan Shop and the Maine Hockey Hall of Fame.

The Grateful Dead played Alfond on April 19, 1983. Scott Hamilton's Stars on Ice opened in Alfond Arena in 1986. Hillary Clinton appeared at the arena in 1994. It takes two hours to make the transition from basketball to hockey, and about 2½ from hockey to basketball. New, energy-efficient lighting was installed in late 2006 because of previous power outages and too much electricity consumption. A new scoreboard was installed during the summer of 2008. A new basketball floor was purchased in late 2009 to replace the original floor first used in 1992. A $4.8 million renovation project began in May 2011. The renovation included a new ice system along with dehumidifier equipment, new dasher boards and glass, and new lower-level seating.

See also
 List of NCAA Division I basketball arenas

References

External links
 Alfond Arena at GoBlackBears.com
 Merrimack College Has Alfond Nightmares

College ice hockey venues in the United States
Basketball venues in Maine
Buildings and structures at the University of Maine
Indoor ice hockey venues in Maine
Maine Black Bears basketball venues
Tourist attractions in Penobscot County, Maine
Sports venues completed in 1977
1977 establishments in Maine
Sports venues in Penobscot County, Maine